Paul Graham (born 1956) is a British fine-art and documentary photographer. He has published three survey monographs, along with 17 other publications.

His work has been exhibited in the Italian Pavilion of the 49th Venice Biennale (2001), Switzerland's national Fotomuseum Winterthur, and a solo exhibition at New York City's Museum of Modern Art. He was included in Tate's Cruel and Tender survey exhibition of 20th century photography (2003), and a European mid career survey exhibition at Museum Folkwang, Essen, which toured to the Deichtorhallen, Germany, and Whitechapel Gallery, London. A 2015 survey of his American work, The Whiteness of the Whale, was exhibited at the High Museum of Art in Atlanta.

Graham has won the Deutsche Börse Photography Prize, the Hasselblad Award, the W. Eugene Smith Grant, received a Guggenheim Fellowship, and won the inaugural Paris Photo-Aperture Foundation PhotoBook Awards prize for best photographic book of the past 15 years.

Life and career 
Between 1981 and the end of 1982, Graham photographed people and places along the A1 road in Britain (which mainly parallels the Great North Road), from the Bank of England in the City of London, and travelling north. His portrait of the nation was published in 1983 as A1: The Great North Road.

His book Empty Heaven is devoted to Japan; another, A Shimmer of Possibility, comprises 12 volumes examining everyday life in the USA.

Publications

Books of work by Graham
A1 - The Great North Road. Bristol: Grey, 1983. .
London: Mack, 2020. . With an introduction by Rupert Martin, and afterwords by Graham for the 1983 and the 2020 editions.
Beyond Caring. Bristol: Grey, 1985. .
Books on Books 9. New York: Errata, 2010. . With essays by David Chandler and Jeffrey Ladd. Facsimile edition.
London: Mack, 2021. . With one additional photograph.
Troubled Land. Bristol: Grey, 1987. .
In Umbra Res. Bradford: National Museum of Photography, Film, and Television, 1991.
New Europe. Fotomuseum Winterthur, 1992. .
Empty Heaven. Zurich: Scalo, 1995. .
Paul Graham. Contemporary Artists. Phaidon, London, 1996. With texts by Andrew Wilson, Carol Squiers, Kazuo Ishiguro, Haruki Murakami and Graham, and interviews between Graham and Gillian Wearing and Lewis Baltz. .
End of an Age. Zurich: Scalo, 1999. .
Paintings. New York, NY: Greenberg Van Doren Gallery, 2000. .
American Night. Göttingen: SteidlMack, 2003. .
A Shimmer of Possibility. Göttingen: SteidlMack, 2007. . 12 volume hardback.
A Shimmer of Possibility. Göttingen: SteidlMack, 2009. single volume softback.
Paul Graham. Göttingen: SteidlMack, 2009. .
 Europe: America. Madrid: La Fábrica, 2011. . Said to juxtapose two series, New Europe (1986–1992) and A Shimmer of Possibility (2004–2006). Accompanying an exhibition at the Fundación Botín in 2011/2012 curated by Vicente Todolí.
Films. London: Mack, 2011. .
The Present. London: Mack, 2012. .
1981 & 2011. Gothenburg, Sweden: Hasselblad Foundation; London: Mack, 2012. . Produced in conjunction with his receiving the Hasselblad Award and an exhibition. Edited by Graham in collaboration with Dragana Vujanovic and Louise Wolthers from The Hasselblad Foundation and with a text by David Campany, "Noticing". Said to unite A1 – The Great North Road (1981) and The Present (2011).
Does Yellow Run Forever?. London: Mack, 2014. .
The Whitness of the Whale. London: Mack; San Francisco, Pier 24 Photography, 2015. . Exhibition catalogue. Includes American Night, A Shimmer of Possibility and The Present. With texts by David Chandler and Stanley Wolukau-Wanambwa.
Paris 11~15th November 2015. London: Mack, 2016. .
Mother. London: Mack, 2019. .

Books edited by Graham
But Still, it Turns. London: Mack, 2021. . Includes work from Gregory Halpern's ZZYZX; Vanessa Winship's She Dances on Jackson, Curran Hatleberg's Lost Coast, Stanley Wolukau-Wanambwa's One Wall a Web, Richard Choi's What Remains, RaMell Ross' South County, Emanuele Bruti and Piergiorgio Casotti's collaborative Index G, and Kristine Potter's Manifest. With essays by Graham, Rebecca Bengal, RaMell Ross, and Ian Penman. Published in conjunction with an exhibition at the International Center of Photography, New York, 2021.

Exhibitions

Solo and group exhibitions 
 Troubled Land; within The New British Document (also with Keith Arnatt, John Davies, Peter Fraser and Martin Parr, curated by Sally Eauclaire), Museum of Contemporary Photography, Columbia College Chicago, May–June 1986.
 Conflits en Irlande du Nord, Rencontres d'Arles, Arles, France, 1987.
 New Europe, Fotomuseum Winterthur, 1993.
 Empty Heaven, Kunstmuseum Wolfsburg, 1995.
 Hypermetropia, Tate Gallery, London, 1996.
 End of an Age, Portfolio Gallery, Edinburgh, 1998; Galerie Bob Van Orsouw, Zurich, 1998.
 Cruel and Tender, Tate, London, 2003. Group survey exhibition of 20th century photography.
 American Night, Anthony Reynolds Gallery, London, 2003; Power House, Memphis, TN, 2003; PS1, New York, 2003.
 American Pictures, Whitney Museum of American Art, New York City, 2004.
 American Night, Rencontres d'Arles, Arles, France, 2006; La Fábrica, Madrid, 2006.
 Click Double Click, The Documentary Factor, Haus der Kunst, Munich, 2006; Centre for Fine Arts, Brussels, 2006
 A Shimmer of Possibility, La Fábrica, Madrid, 2008; Museum of Modern Art, New York City, 2009.
 Paul Graham. Photographs 1981–2006, Museum Folkwang, Essen, Germany, 2009; Deichtorhallen, Hamburg, Germany, 2010; Whitechapel Gallery, London, 2011.
The Whiteness of the Whale, Pier 24 Photography, San Francisco, August 2015 – February 2016; and toured to the High Museum of Art, Atlanta; Bombas Gens in Valencia; and Rencontres d'Arles, France.

Exhibitions curated by Graham
But Still, it Turns, International Center of Photography, New York, 2021. Includes work by Gregory Halpern, Vanessa Winship, Curran Hatleberg, Stanley Wolukau-Wanambwa, Richard Choi, RaMell Ross, Kristine Potter, and Emanuele Bruti and Piergiorgio Casotti.

Awards 
1983: Winston Churchill Memorial Trusts fellowship.
1988: W. Eugene Smith Grant from the W. Eugene Smith Memorial Fund.
2009: Deutsche Börse Photography Prize.
2009: Honorary Fellowship of the Royal Photographic Society
2010: Guggenheim Fellowship from the John Simon Guggenheim Memorial Foundation.
2011: Best photographic book of the past 15 years for Shimmer of Possibility, awarded by Paris Photo as a precursor to the Paris Photo–Aperture Foundation PhotoBook Awards, presented in The PhotoBook Review.
2012: Hasselblad Award from the Hasselblad Foundation, Gothenburg, Sweden.

Collections 
Graham's work is held in the following public collections:

References

External links 

Paul Graham biography and selected works at carlier | gebauer

1956 births
Living people
20th-century British photographers
Photography in Japan
Social documentary photographers
English contemporary artists
21st-century British photographers